The 2000 Iowa Republican presidential caucuses took place on January 24, 2000. The Iowa Republican caucuses are an unofficial primary, with the delegates to the state convention selected proportionally via a straw poll. The Iowa caucuses marked the traditional formal start of the delegate selection process for the 2000 United States presidential election.

Prior to the 2000 caucuses, as in previous election cycles with a competitive presidential race, an unofficial Ames Straw Poll was held, on August 14, 1999. The official one, electing delegates to the state convention, was held on January 24, 2000, the same day as the Democratic contest. In the Ames Straw Poll, George W. Bush finished first with 31% of the vote. In the January 2000 caucuses, Bush again finished first with 41% of the vote.

As of the 2020 presidential election, Bush is the first and only Republican to win the Republican straw poll, the Iowa caucuses, the Republican nomination, and the presidency.

January 2000 procedure
Unlike the Democratic caucus, the Republican Party does not use voting rounds or have minimum requirements for a percent of votes. The Republican version is done with a straw vote of those attending the caucus. This vote is sometimes done by a show of hands or by dividing themselves into groups according to candidate. However, officially it is done with voters receiving a blank piece of paper with no names on it, and the voter writing a name and placing it in a ballot box.

Following the straw poll, delegates are then elected from the remaining participants in the room, as most voters leave once their vote is cast. All delegates are officially considered unbound, but media outlets either apportion delegates proportionally or apportion them in terms of winner-take-all by counties. In precincts that elect only one delegate, the delegate is chosen by majority vote and the vote must be by paper ballot. The state party strongly urges that delegates reflect the results of the preference poll, but there is no obligation that they do so.

The Ames Straw Poll

The 2000 Ames straw poll was held at Iowa State University (Ames)'s Hilton Coliseum on August 14, 1999. This was primarily a fundraising event for the state's Republican Party, and only Iowa residents who paid the $25 price for a ticket were eligible to vote. Tickets were available through the various presidential campaigns and the Iowa Republican Party's headquarters. 

In general, the candidates bought large blocks of tickets and gave them out for free to whoever agreed to go and vote for that candidate. The candidates also rented buses to transport voters to Ames.

George W. Bush finished first with 31% of the vote, followed by Steve Forbes (21%), Elizabeth Dole (14%), and Gary Bauer (9%). Eight other candidates shared the remaining 25% of the vote.

Results of the January 2000 caucuses
Because Iowa's delegates aren't officially bound to candidates, the delegates given to each candidate below are rough estimates.

Three candidates won majorities or pluralities in the individual counties: George W. Bush, Steve Forbes, and Gary Bauer. The McCain campaign chose to skip the Iowa caucuses and instead campaign in New Hampshire, where McCain would win a landslide victory eight days later.

Following the caucus, Senator Orrin Hatch of Utah withdrew his campaign following his poor last place performance.

See also
 Iowa caucuses
 2000 Iowa Democratic presidential caucuses
 2000 Republican Party presidential primaries

References

2000
Iowa
Republican caucuses